Banjar Mohammed Al Dosari (born 8 August 1981) is a Qatari football referee who has been a full international referee for FIFA.

Al Dosari was a FIFA referee from 2008 to 2016. He has served as a referee at competitions including the 2014 FIFA World Cup qualifiers, beginning with the preliminary-round match between Palestine and Afghanistan.

References

External links 
 
 
 

1981 births
Living people
Qatari football referees